Josef Augusta may refer to:

 Josef Augusta (ice hockey) (1946–2017), Czech ice hockey player and coach
 Josef Augusta (paleontologist) (1903–1968), Czechoslovak paleontologist, geologist, and science popularizer